Hovamicrodon is a subgenus of the hoverfly genus Archimicrodon, endemic to Madagascar. Hovamicrodon is distinguished by a particular type of scutellar calcar, being broad and blunt apically.

Species
The six known species are:
A. flavifacies (Keiser, 1971)
A. fuscipennis (Keiser, 1971)
A. hova (Herve-Bazin, 1913)
A. nubecula (Keiser, 1971)
A. silvester (Keiser, 1971)
A. vulpicolor (Hull, 1941)

References

Microdontinae
Diptera of Africa
Insect subgenera